Pawns and Symbols is a science fiction novel by American writer Majliss Larson, part of the Star Trek: The Original Series franchise.

Plot
Jean Czerny, a Federation survivor of an earthquake, is suffering from amnesia. She becomes involved in a Klingon crisis, caused by an empire-wide famine. Captain Kirk and the Klingon Captain Kang clash over the potential war brewing and the fate of Jean.

Reception
Ann-Marie Cahill of BookRiot.com praised the book for "one of the more memorable depictions of Klingons" as it shows Klingon culture beyond war and battles, and depicts Klingon scientists, doctors, and civilians.

References

External links

Novels based on Star Trek: The Original Series
1985 American novels
American science fiction novels